Águas Livres may refer to:

 The Águas Livres Aqueduct, a historic aqueduct in the city of Lisbon, Portugal
 Águas Livres (Amadora), a Portuguese urban civil parish in the municipality of Amadora